The Alor myzomela (Myzomela prawiradilagae) is a species of bird in the family Meliphagidae, the honeyeaters. It is endemic to the Indonesian island of Alor, where it is the only representative member of the genus Myzomela. It is named after Dewi Malia Prawiradilaga, an ornithologist at the Indonesian Institute of Science and one of the first leading female Indonesian ornithologists.

Taxonomy 
It closely resembles and is most closely related to the Wetar myzomela (M. kuehni) of the adjacent island of Wetar. However, it noticeably differs in its calls and morphology.

Distribution 
The Alor myzomela is restricted to a few montane areas of Alor Island, where it lives in Eucalyptus woodlands primarily composed of white gum (Eucalyptus alba) and Timor mountain gum (Eucalyptus urophylla), as well as wattles (Acacia sp.) and sheoak (Casuarina junghuhniana). This restricted distribution is in contrast to its close relative M. kuehni, which is among the most common birds on its islands; this difference may be due to the different habitat requirements of the two species.

Diet 
They have been observed feeding on the fruit of Himalayan chokeberry (Photinia integrifolia) in small groups along with ashy-bellied white-eyes (Zosterops citrinellus). They also feed on the flowers of Eucalyptus alba, as well as occasionally insects.

Threats 
This species is at high risk due to its severely restricted and fragmented distribution, which is compounded by the growing human population on the island. Thus, it has been proposed that the species be classified as Endangered on the IUCN Red List.

References 

Alor myzomela
Endemic fauna of Indonesia
Birds of the Lesser Sunda Islands
Alor myzomela